The Democratic Republic of the Congo is a country located in the African Great Lakes region of Central Africa. It is the second largest country in Africa by area and the eleventh largest in the world. With a population of over 75 million, the Democratic Republic of the Congo is the nineteenth most populous nation in the world, the fourth most populous nation in Africa, as well as the most populous officially Francophone country.

Sparsely populated in relation to its area, the country is home to a vast potential of natural resources and mineral wealth, its untapped deposits of raw minerals are estimated to be worth in excess of US$24 trillion, yet the economy of the Democratic Republic of the Congo has declined drastically since the mid-1980s. At the time of its independence in 1960, the Democratic Republic of the Congo was the second most industrialized country in Africa after South Africa; it boasted a thriving mining sector and its agriculture sector was relatively productive. Since then, however, corruption, war and political instability have been a severe detriment to further growth, today leaving DRC with the world's lowest GDP per capita.

Notable firms 
This list includes notable companies with primary headquarters located in the country. The industry and sector follow the Industry Classification Benchmark taxonomy. Organizations which have ceased operations are included and noted as defunct.

See also 
 Economy of the Democratic Republic of the Congo
 List of airlines of the Democratic Republic of the Congo
 List of banks in the Democratic Republic of the Congo
 Mining industry of the Democratic Republic of the Congo

References

External links 
 

Congo, Democratic Republic Of The

Economy of the Democratic Republic of the Congo-related lists